Radford Studio Center, alternatively CBS Studio Center, is a television and film studio located in the Studio City district of Los Angeles in the San Fernando Valley. The triangular site is bisected by the Los Angeles River. In 2021, ViacomCBS sold Studio Center to real estate investment companies Hackman Capital Partners and Square Mile Capital Management.

ViacomCBS also previously had ownership of two other studios in the area: CBS Television City and Columbia Square.

History 
Mack Sennett, a silent film producer and director, came to the San Fernando Valley and opened his new movie studio at this location (at what is now Ventura Boulevard and Radford Avenue) in May 1928. He previously operated a smaller studio on Glendale Boulevard in Echo Park (then called Edendale) where he produced films featuring the Keystone Kops, Charlie Chaplin, Mabel Normand, Buster Keaton, W. C. Fields, and Fatty Arbuckle.

Five years after creating the Studio City lot, Sennett was forced to file for bankruptcy and the studio lot was sold to Mascot Pictures. Mascot, which specialized in serials, renamed the studio after itself. By 1935, another film company, Monogram Pictures, along with Mascot and Consolidated Film Corporation merged to form Republic Pictures Corporation. The studio lot was renamed Republic Studios. The new studio specialized in B-movies, including many Westerns starring the likes of Roy Rogers, Gene Autry, and John Wayne, all of whom gained their first breaks with Republic.

In the 1950s, Republic leased studio space to Revue Productions, which filmed many early television series on the lot (including early episodes of Leave It To Beaver) before Revue's owner, MCA acquired Universal Pictures and moved Revue's television production to Universal City. Also, Four Star Productions leased the lot for many of its series like The Rifleman, Dick Powell's Zane Grey Theater, and The Big Valley. Republic Pictures ceased production in 1958 and Victor M. Carter became its president in 1959. Carter built Republic into a diversified business with foci outside of the television and film business, and so began leasing its lot to CBS.

In 1963, CBS Television became the primary lessee of the lot. Almost immediately after leasing the Republic Pictures lot, CBS began to locate its network-produced filmed shows there, including Gunsmoke, My Three Sons, and Gilligan's Island. (The Wild Wild West followed in 1965). The Gilligan's Island lagoon was located at the northwestern edge of the lot; it was paved in the mid-1990s to make room for a new parking structure. While under lease, the facility was renamed the CBS Studio Center. The network finally purchased the 70-acre lot outright from Republic in February 1967, for $9.5 million. That same month, Republic also sold its film library. CBS built new sound stages, office buildings, and technical facilities. To make up for these investments, CBS began to rent its studio lot to independent producers, and the newly created MTM Enterprises (headed by actress Mary Tyler Moore and then-husband Grant Tinker) became the Studio Center's primary tenant, beginning in 1970.

Moore's memorable sitcom The Mary Tyler Moore Show began filming here in 1970. Later, its spinoffs Rhoda, Phyllis, and Lou Grant were shot in the facility. In July 1982, CBS formed a partnership with 20th Century Fox to share ownership of the Studio Center, thus once again renaming, this time as CBS/Fox Studios. However, that relationship was short-lived as Fox sold its interest of the Studio Center to MTM, and it became CBS-MTM Studios. In March 1992, the studio once again became CBS Studio Center, when MTM (which was later purchased by 20th Century Fox's parent company, News Corporation) sold its interest in the studio lot to CBS.

From 1991 to 1996, American Gladiators was videotaped at CBS Studio Center. The original "Gladiator Arena" (Stage 3) remains preserved in its original form in its original location, with tours and group events available.

The studio has been one of the most active in the city for producing sitcoms. It is also the base for "Semester in L.A.", a six-week course by Columbia College Chicago.

Since 2007, the Studio Center serves as the home to CBS's Los Angeles flagship TV station KCBS-TV, along with sister station KCAL-TV, as they vacated Columbia Square to move into a newly built, digitally-enhanced office and studio facility located where the house for the CBS reality series Big Brother once stood. The CBS Studio City Broadcast Center also houses the Los Angeles bureau of CBS News, which is shared with the KCBS/KCAL local newsroom, and on occasion, the CBS Evening News is anchored from Los Angeles.

In 2008, Entertainment Tonight and The Insider moved from the Paramount backlot to Studio Center, as CBS took ownership of the series after its spin-off from Viacom.

A re-merged ViacomCBS (now Paramount Global) announced in 2021 that it intended to sell the facility as part of a corporate effort to focus on content. In November 2021, ViacomCBS announced that the studio would be sold to Hackman Capital Partners and Square Mile Capital Management for $1.85 billion. This would leave the Paramount Pictures lot as the only studio facilities in Los Angeles owned by the company.

In February 2023, The Los Angeles Times reported that "Radford Studio Center is set to get a $1-billion upgrade to expand its facilities and bring them further into the digital age". Los Angeles officials received a plan from the owners of the lot formerly known as CBS Studio Center to revamp and enlarge the aging studio and broadcasting complex. Deadline Hollywood reported that the upgrades will include "modern soundstages, production and support offices, sustainability measures, historic preservation, and a transportation infrastructure."

Backlot 
Radford Studio Center has three backlot areas. The first is the New York Street. During the shooting of Seinfeld in the mid-1990s, a New York Street was built to facilitate the filming of exterior shots.

The second area is the Central Park area. The area features grass, trees, paths, and can also be filled with water to create a pond or swamp. 

The third area is the Residential Street. Actually made up of two streets, this area features a number of houses which can be used for a variety of productions.

News tenants 
 CBS News
 KCBS-TV/KCAL-TV

Television shows 

 The $100,000 Pyramid (2022)
 100 Questions
 106 & Park
 3rd Rock from the Sun 9JKL A Different World A.P. Bio Accidentally on Purpose According to Jim Alone Together American Gladiators (1991–96)
 American Housewife Are You Smarter than a 5th Grader? (2007)
 Baby Daddy Bad Teacher The Bernie Mac Show Bet on Your Baby Better with You Big Brother Big Brother: Over the Top The Big Valley The Bill Engvall Show The Bob Newhart Show Boston Common Boy Meets World Brooklyn Nine-Nine Cane Can't Hurry Love Card Sharks (2020–21)
 Caroline in the City Celebrity Big Brother Celebrity Circus The Chase (2021–present)
 The Class The Cleaner CSI: Cyber CSI: NY Colony Combat! Community Criminal Minds: Beyond Borders Cybill Dave's World The Defenders Designing Women Don't Forget the Lyrics! (2022)
 The Doris Day Show (1969–73)
 Double Dare (2018–19)
 Duets The Ellen Show Entertainment Tonight (2008–present)
 Evening Shade The Exes Falcon Crest Family Affair Food Network Star (2016)
 The Game Gary Unmarried Get Smart Gilligan's Island Girlfriends Good Morning, Miami Grace Under Fire Grandfathered  
 Greek Greg the Bunny Grounded for Life Gunsmoke Half & Half Happily Divorced Hearts Afire Hill Street Blues Hip Hop Squares Hole in the Wall (2008–09)
 Hot in Cleveland How to Be a Gentleman If Not for You It's Always Sunny in Philadelphia The Insider (2008–17)
 The Jeff Foxworthy Show Just Shoot Me! Kevin from Work Kirstie The Larry Sanders Show Last Man Standing Leave It to Beaver Less than Perfect Lou Grant Malcolm in the Middle Malibu Country Man with a Plan The Mary Tyler Moore Show Masters of the Maze The Mayor Melissa & Joey The Millers Million Dollar Password Minute to Win It (2010–11)
 The Moment of Truth Mulaney My Three Sons My Two Dads Mystery Girls The Naked Truth Newhart NewsRadio The Nine Lives of Chloe King The O'Keefes On the Lot (Adrianna Costa-hosted shows)
 The Odd Couple (2015)
 Outsourced Parks and Recreation Passions The Paul Reiser Show Perfect Couples Phyllis Planet of the Apps Playing House Press Your Luck (2021)
 The Pyramid Rawhide The Real O'Neals Remington Steele Retired at 35 Rhoda Riot Rita Rocks Rodney Romantically Challenged Roommates Roseanne (original series & 2018 revival)
 Roundhouse (1993–96)
 Ruby & The Rockits Samantha Who? The Sarah Silverman Program SEAL Team Seinfeld The Singing Bee The Single Guy The Soul Man Spin City St. Elsewhere State of Georgia Still Standing Superior Donuts Survivor Finale and reunion shows
 That '70s Show That '80s Show The Talk Thirtysomething Titus Tracey Ullman's State of the Union Twisted Unhappily Ever After United States of Tara The Virginian The Voice The White Shadow Whitney The Wild Wild West Will & Grace (1998–2006)
 WKRP in Cincinnati Win, Lose or Draw (2014)
 Wisdom of the Crowd Yes, Dear Young & Hungry Theatrical films 

 The Addams Family April Fools The Back Up Plan Borderline Boys on the Side Dr. Dolittle Dr. Dolittle 2 Faster Father of the Bride I Love Trouble Jay and Silent Bob Strike Back Little Big Man Le Mans Mr. Wrong The Muppet Movie Raise the Titanic Scream 3''

References

External links 
 Radford Studio Center
 Seeing Stars: CBS Studio Center

Buildings and structures in the San Fernando Valley
Buildings and structures completed in 1928
CBS television studios
Studio City, Los Angeles
1928 establishments in California
Former CBS Corporation subsidiaries